Quadrille is a 1938 French comedy film directed by Sacha Guitry and starring Guitry, Gaby Morlay and Jacqueline Delubac.

The film's sets were designed by the art director Jean Perrier. It was shot at the Joinville Studios in Paris and on location around the city. The title refers to the quadrille, a dance in which the participants keep changing partners.

It was later remade as a film of the same title by Valérie Lemercier.

Synopsis
In Paris the arrival of an American film star upsets the routine of a French newspaper editor and his two female companions.

Cast
 Sacha Guitry as Philippe de Morannes  
 Gaby Morlay as Paulette Nanteuil  
 Jacqueline Delubac as Claudine André  
 Georges Grey as Carl Erickson  
 Pauline Carton as La femme de chambre de l'hôtel  
 Jacques Vitry as Le docteur  
 Louis Baldy as Durmel  
 Julien Rivière as Le maître d'hôtel 
 Louis Vonelly as Le chef de réception  
 Paul Alex as Le concierge  
 Marc Hélin as Un chasseur  
 Pierre Huchet as Un valet de chambre  
 Georges Lemaire as Le régisseur  
 Marie-Claire Pissaro as Une femme de chambre  
 Clary Monthal as Une habilleuse  
 Marguerite Templey as Madame de Germond 
 Adolphe Borchard as Lui-même dans le générique  
 Robert Lefebvre as Lui-même dans le générique  
 Ray Ventura as himself

References

Bibliography 
 Dayna Oscherwitz & MaryEllen Higgins. The A to Z of French Cinema. Scarecrow Press, 2009.

External links 
 

1938 films
French comedy films
1938 comedy films
1930s French-language films
Films directed by Sacha Guitry
Films set in Paris
Films shot in Paris
Films shot at Joinville Studios
French black-and-white films
1930s French films